The Martin BM7, and its successor and derivative, the Martin BM8, are 2-liter sports prototype race cars, designed, developed, and built by British racing driver, automotive engineer, and mechanic, Brian Martin, in 1969 and 1970, respectively. They were constructed to compete in the European 2-Litre Championship sports car racing series. These cars won a total of 8 races (plus 3 additional class wins), and scored 20 podium finishes.

References

Sports prototypes
Cars of England
1960s cars
1970s cars